Over my dead body  may refer to:

Film and television
Over My Dead Body (1942 film), American comedy mystery film
Over My Dead Body (1995 film), German romantic comedy film
Over My Dead Body, a 2007 documentary produced by Vickie Gest
Over My Dead Body (2012 Canadian film), documentary film
Over My Dead Body (2012 South Korean film), crime comedy film
Over My Dead Body (TV series), 1990–1991 American detective drama series
"Over My Dead Body" (Grimm), 2012 TV episode
"Over My Dead Body", 2011 TV episode, see Pretty Little Liars (season 2)

Literature
Over My Dead Body (novel), a 1940 Nero Wolfe novel by Rex Stout
Over My Dead Body (1957) and Over My Dead Body: Forty Years On (1996), books by June Opie

Music
Over My Dead Body (band), an American straight-edge hardcore band
"Over My Dead Body" (song), a 2011 song by Drake

Other uses
Over My Dead Body (play), a 1989 play by Michael Sutton and Anthony Fingleton
Over My Dead Body (podcast), an American true-crime podcast
Over My Dead Body (Ramon Casas), an 1893 painting by Ramon Casas

See also
Over Her Dead Body, a 2008 comedy film directed by Jeff Lowell
Over Her Dead Body (2022 film), a Nigerian film by Sola Osofisan
 Over Her Dead Body: Death, Femininity and the Aesthetic, a 1992 book by Elisabeth Bronfen
Laconic phrase
Molon labe